Clare Munnings is the pen name for two American mystery authors, Jill Ker Conway (former president of Smith College) and Elizabeth Topham Kennan (alumna and former president of Mount Holyoke College).  Their first novel, Overnight Float, was published in 2000. Jean Ker Conway was born and raised in Corrain, Australia.

Books

See also

List of crime writers

External links
 Powells book review
Murder They  Wrote (Mount Holyoke College)
Former Presidents  Craft a Thriller (Smith College)
 http://www.detecs.org/stubbs.html

Collective pseudonyms
21st-century American novelists
American crime fiction writers
American women novelists
Writing duos
21st-century American women writers
Women crime fiction writers
Pseudonymous women writers
21st-century pseudonymous writers